Jean-Noël Guérini (born 1 January 1951 in Calenzana, Corsica) is a member of the Senate of France, representing the Bouches-du-Rhône department since 1998. He was the president of the General council (conseil général) of Bouches-du-Rhône from 1998 to 2015 and member of the municipal council of Marseille since 1977.
He was a member of the Socialist Party.

References
Page on the Senate website

External links

1951 births
Living people
French Senators of the Fifth Republic
People named in the Panama Papers
Senators of Bouches-du-Rhône
Socialist Party (France) politicians
Politicians from Provence-Alpes-Côte d'Azur
Corsican politicians
French people of Corsican descent
People from Haute-Corse
French politicians convicted of crimes